

Events 
The Bach-Abel concerts are founded.
The Bergen Philharmonic Orchestra ("Harmonien") is founded.
First flamenco school established in Spain.

Popular music 
James Hook – "I wish you all good night" (song)

Opera 
Johann Adolph Hasse - "Romolo ed Ersilla"
Johann Friedrich Agricola – Achille in Sciro, premiered Sept. 16 in Berlin
Samuel Arnold
Daphne and Amintor
The Summer's Tale
Georg Benda – Xindo riconnosciuto
Andrea Bernasconi – Semiramide riconosciuta
Christoph Willibald Gluck – 
Alexandre
Il Parnaso confuso, Wq.33
Semiramis
Josef Mysliveček – Il Bellerofonte
Antonio Sacchini 
La contadina in corte
Creso
Tommaso Traetta – Semiramide

Classical music 

 Wilhelm Friedemann Bach – 12 Polonaises, F.12
Joseph Haydn
Divertimento in E-flat major, Hob.II:6
Divertimento in F major, Hob.II:33
Divertimento in D major, Hob.II:35
Divertimento in G major, Hob.II:36
Divertimento in E major, Hob.II:37
String Trio in B-flat major, Hob.V:B1
Divertimento in G major, Hob.XIV:13
Divertimento in D major, Hob.XVI:4
Keyboard Sonata in C major, Hob.XVI:15 (authorship in question)
Keyboard Sonata in F major, Hob.XVI:47 (authorship in question)
Symphony No. 28
Cello Concerto No. 1
 Johann Ludwig Krebs – Sonata in A minor, Krebs-WV 838
Wolfgang Amadeus Mozart 
"God Is Our Refuge", K.20
"Conservati fedele", K.23
Giovanni Marco Rutini – 6 Harpsichord Sonatas, Op.6
 Georg Philipp Telemann 
Symphonie zur Serenate, TWV Anh.50:1 
Grillen-Symphonie, TWV 50:1

Publications
Carl Philipp Emanuel Bach – Clavierstücke verschiedener Art (Berlin), Wq.112
Johann Christian Bach – Six Simphonies, Op. 3 (London)
Placidus von Camerloher – Sei sonate a tre, due violini e basso (6 Trio Sonatas), Op. 2 (Paris: Le Clerc, Mme Boivin)
Armand-Louis Couperin – Sonates en pièces de clavecin avec accompagnement de violon ad libitum, Op. 2 (Paris)
Francesco Guerini – Six Solos (cello sonatas), Op. 9 (London, approximately this year)

Methods and theory writings 
 Robert Crome – The Compleat Tutor for the Violoncello
 Pierre Simon Fournier – Traité historique et critique sur l’origine et les progrès des caractères de fonte pour l’impression de la musique
 Georg Simon Löhlein – Klavier-Schule
 Giuseppe Paolucci – Arte pratica di contrappunto
 Michael Johann Friedrich Weideburg – Der sich selbst informirende Clavierspieler

Births 
February 8 – Joseph Leopold Eybler, composer (died 1846)
June 13 – Anton Eberl, composer (died 1807)
June 26 – Franz Xaver Kleinheinz, composer (died 1832)
September 18 – Oliver Holden, composer (died 1844)
October 7 – Michał Kleofas Ogiński, Polish composer (died 1833)
October 22 – Daniel Steibelt, pianist and composer (died 1823)
October 26 – Jakub Jan Ryba, composer (died 1815)
November 20 – Friedrich Heinrich Himmel, composer (died 1814)
November 23 – Thomas Attwood, composer (died 1838)
December 25 – Joseph Mazzinghi, British composer (died 1844)
Date unknown – Sofia Liljegren Finnish soprano (died 1795)

Deaths 
January 12 – Johann Melchior Molter, German composer and violinist (born 1696)
January 15 – Carlmann Kolb, composer (born 1703)
January 19 – Johan Agrell, composer (born 1701)
February 9 – Elisabetta de Gambarini, singer, composer and conductor (born 1730)
March 20 – Paolo Antonio Rolli, librettist (born 1687)
December 30 – Conrad Friedrich Hurlebusch, organist and composer (born c. 1691)
date unknown
John Hebden, bassoonist, cellist and composer (born 1712)
Edward Henry Purcell, organist and music publisher
probable – Louis-Antoine Dornel, harpsichordist, violinist and composer (born c.1685)

 
18th century in music
Music by year